A nǎiyóu sū bǐng is a buttery flaky pastry made into a thin circle. It is a speciality food in the Dajia District of Taiwan. The dough has many layers, of which each is very thin and crisp. The filling is composed of butter and maltose.

References 
 

Taiwanese pastries